John C. Bell may refer to:

John Cameron Bell (born 1953), Canadian cancer researcher
John C. Bell (lawyer) (1861–1935), Pennsylvania lawyer and football rulesmaker
John C. Bell Jr. (1892–1974), Pennsylvania politician and judge
John Calhoun Bell (1851–1933), U.S. Representative from Colorado

See also
John Bell (disambiguation)